is a nine volume shōjo manga written by Makoto Tateno.

Plot
A high school student named Manami Minami is a beginner at the new line Trading Card Game, Chaos. Through a great stroke of luck, she obtains "Saghan the Mighty Sorcerer", an ultra rare card that is supposedly out of print. Now suddenly, every Chaos player in Japan is after Manami, attempting to take Saghan from her in a duel. With her cousin Tamotsu and her friends/rivals Miyako and Ko helping her out, and Saghan giving her tips on how to win in her dreams, Manami is on her way to becoming a Chaos champion. But can she balance her gamer life with her normal life?

Characters

 Manami Minami

 The main protagonist. By sheer luck, she obtains Saghan in a beginner's pack, and is now the target of every gamer in Japan. Her methods of winning come from her dreams, where she receives advice from Saghan himself. She's still learning the rules of Chaos, but she beaten every opponent she's met at least once. Her Deck shifts during every match, but Sahgan is always her main card, and sorcerers and spirits like Pixie and Domovoi as her major cards. She later obtains Faras, the Holy Shrine Maiden. She finds romance harder to understand than the rules of the game.
 Saghan

 The spirit of the "Mighty Sorcerer" Card, and Manami's constant ally. He communicates with Manami through her dreams, telling her how to win. Other card collectors have given Saghan the nickname "King of Cards". Manami soon learns that the Sahgan card she got was the first trial card for the Japanese version of Chaos.
 Tamotsu Kazama

 Manami's cousin. He's a Chaos expert, and gets her interested in the first place. His favorite card is The Angel of Destruction.
 Miyako Kiyoguchi

 At first, she was a disrespectful player, who threw away cards she didn't want, but changes her way of thinking after losing to Manami. She uses the Four Archangels, Four Demon Lords, and the Four Great Sorcerers. While she helps Manami from time to time, she really wants to take Saghan for herself. She soon reveals that Ko is her brother, separated by divorce, and used the rumors of the two being a couple to repel unwanted crushes.
 Kō Tōjō

 Miyako's brother, and a rival and friend of Tamotsu. He has some respect towards Manami, and may even harbor feelings for her. His favorite card is the Angel of Death, and he uses many other cards associated with the subject of death.
 Riki Hikami

 A Junior High boy, who known as the "Angel" to other Chaos players, because he is a master with Angel cards, no matter which Army he's playing.
 Mr. Nanba

 Owner of the Roxy, the store that Manani and her friends regularly play at.
 The Ghoul Brothers
 A duo of Twin Chaos players who get their nickname from their use of Monster-Type cards. They both harbor a grudge towards Manami, but help her out regardless.
 Tsuyoshi Tachibana

 Champion of the Kanto Tournament who has the nickname "Salamander". He's an expert with Fire Element Cards. He's the only person who was able to beat Manami and take Sahgan, although she defeats him later.
 Misa Tachibana

 Tsuyoshi's stepsister. She hates "Chaos", is in love with Tamotsu, and is one of Manami's rivals. She defeats Manami in a duel, but lets her keep Sahgan. She loses to Manami in the Kanto Tournament, and regains interest in Chaos. She plays mostly a Goddess Deck.
 Toru Kanemoto

 Manami's homeroom teacher. He was a top-notch Chaos player back in the day. He loans Manami a powerful card called Barat's Evil Eye. His collection consists of several hard to find cards.
 Koji Suzaki

 An expert in Beast cards. He's almost never seen without his dog Fenrir. He often hides cards in his sleeves to add to his hand when he wants. He takes Sahgan from Manami, but loses it in a match. However, he seems to have been working for someone else.
 Ryo Araki

 Another of Manami's rivals. He and his friends play for money at a shady store called Wapulgris Night. He has the same kinds of dreams as Manami, but chooses not to pay attention to them. He eventually gives up Chaos, and vows to take Sahgan from Manami to end the dreams, but his real intentions are unknown. His appearance is also similar to Sahgan, revealing that his grandfather was the model for the Sahgan card. He holds the rare Taurus the Alchemist card, which like Manami's Sahgan, is a trial card for the game's Japanese release.
 Akira Hayatani

 One of Tsuyoshi's friends. Nicknamed the "Water Boy" for his use of Water Element Cards.
 Kengo Sasa

 One of Tsuyoshi's friends. Nicknamed the "Prince of Darkness" for his use of Dark Element Cards.
 Tetsu Takanaga

 One of Tsuyoshi's friends. Nicknamed the "Light Bringer" for his use of Light Element Cards.
 Kayo Sanada

 One of Manami's classmates. She seems like an innocent girl, but she is a ruthless player who is nicknamed "The Witch". She has a crush on Araki. Her deck is built around witches and evil spirits.
 Kasumi Nire

 A girl who is a member of Miyako's game club. She has a major crush on Ko and sees Manami as her rival. Her deck uses evil or mischievous spirits like goblins, dwarves, and the Bogeyman.
 Shinya Kuriyama

 A friend of Araki. He has an interest in Magic Item cards, like Manami's Tyrfing the Enchanted Sword, and has built his Deck around them.
 Kagawa

 A member of the Hanyu Gaming Club who, after hearing about Miyako's loss to Manami, researches methods of defeating Sahgan.
 Atsushi Nunoda

 A card collecter who, at first believes Manami's Sahgan is a fake, and decides to use a duel as a means of comparing it to his copy of the card.
 Maalik Fujita

 A young boy with a deck based on the Indian or Hindu gods.
 Sakuya Konohana

 One of Araki's agents, and former champion of the Chaos Ladies' League. Her deck is built around spirits from Japanese mythology, which is a hard to come by series.
 Chiharu Aikawa

 One of Araki's agents, only because he owes him money. Nicknamed, "The Count", his Deck is based on Slavic mythology,with creatures like Werewolves and Vampires.

Publication history

Reception

References

Further reading
 
 
Wiedrick, Jack. "King of Cards Vol. 1". Newtype USA. 6 (9) p. 103. September 2007. .

External links

1999 manga
CMX (comics) titles
Hakusensha manga